David Giammarco is a Canadian sound engineer. He has been nominated for three Academy Awards in the category Best Sound Mixing. He has worked on over 70 films since 1985.

Selected filmography
 3:10 to Yuma (2007)
 Moneyball (2011)
 Ford v Ferrari (2019)

References

External links

Year of birth missing (living people)
Living people
Canadian audio engineers
Best Sound Editing Genie and Canadian Screen Award winners